Waitohu is a settlement in the Kapiti Coast District of the Wellington Region of New Zealand's North Island.  It is located east of Ōtaki, separated by the North Island Main Trunk railway line. Waitohu Valley Road runs southeast from  along the Waitohu Stream, and then leaves the stream and turns northeast.

Demographics

Waitohu had a population of 1,011 at the 2018 New Zealand census, an increase of 84 people (9.1%) since the 2013 census, and an increase of 198 people (24.4%) since the 2006 census. There were 396 households. There were 471 males and 540 females, giving a sex ratio of 0.87 males per female. The median age was 47 years (compared with 37.4 years nationally), with 174 people (17.2%) aged under 15 years, 159 (15.7%) aged 15 to 29, 405 (40.1%) aged 30 to 64, and 270 (26.7%) aged 65 or older.

Ethnicities were 77.2% European/Pākehā, 28.8% Māori, 3.0% Pacific peoples, 5.6% Asian, and 1.8% other ethnicities (totals add to more than 100% since people could identify with multiple ethnicities).

The proportion of people born overseas was 15.1%, compared with 27.1% nationally.

Although some people objected to giving their religion, 49.3% had no religion, 38.6% were Christian, 0.6% were Hindu, 0.3% were Muslim, 0.6% were Buddhist and 1.8% had other religions.

Of those at least 15 years old, 141 (16.8%) people had a bachelor or higher degree, and 195 (23.3%) people had no formal qualifications. The median income was $26,600, compared with $31,800 nationally. The employment status of those at least 15 was that 336 (40.1%) people were employed full-time, 147 (17.6%) were part-time, and 27 (3.2%) were unemployed.

Education
The school opened in 1963.

References

Populated places in the Wellington Region
Kapiti Coast District